Springorum is a surname. Notable people with the surname include:

 Friedrich Springorum (1858–1938), German engineer and entrepreneur
 Horst Schüler-Springorum (1928–2015), German professor of jurisprudence
 Stefanie Schüler-Springorum (born 1962), German historian, daughter of Horst